Sunan Ambu or Batari Sunan Ambu ( Sundanese: ᮘᮒᮛᮤ ᮞᮥᮔᮔ᮪ ᮃᮙ᮪ᮘᮥ)  is a goddess according to Sundanese beliefs, the mother goddess of the Sundanese, and resides in the Kahyangan. She is often portrayed as a mother who, in Sundanese mythology, takes care of the homeland and all honored mortals.

Etymology
Her name is derived from the Sundanese Susuhunan Ambu which can be translated as "The Noble Mother", "Mother Queen" or "Mother Goddess"

In folktales
She is often featured in many folk tales of Sundanese origin, notably Lutung Kasarung, Sangkuriang and Mundinglaya Dikusumah.
Mother goddesses
Indonesian goddesses